The 1877 Kentucky Derby was the 3rd running of the Kentucky Derby. The race took place on May 22, 1877. The 1877 Derby was the first to attract a major celebrity spectator, Polish actress Helena Modjeska.

Full results

Payout
The winner received a purse of $3,300. The second-place finisher received $200.

References

1877
Kentucky Derby
May 1877 sports events
Derby